John Chipman Kerr VC (January 11, 1887 – February 19, 1963), was a Canadian recipient of the Victoria Cross, the highest and most prestigious award for gallantry in the face of the enemy that can be awarded to British and Commonwealth forces.

In 1912, after working as a lumberjack in the Kootenay district of British Columbia, he bought a homestead in Spirit River, Alberta, where he and his brother farmed until war broke out.  Immediately they set out for Edmonton, leaving only a single note tacked to the door of their humble shed. It read: "War is Hell, but what is homesteading?"

He was 29 years old, and a private in the 49th (Edmonton) Battalion,  Canadian Expeditionary Force, during the First World War when the following deed took place for which he was awarded the VC.

On 16 September 1916 at Courcelette, France, during a bombing attack, Private Kerr was acting as bayonet man and noting that bombs were running short, he ran along the parados under heavy fire until he was in close contact with the enemy when he opened fire at point-blank range, inflicting heavy losses. The enemy, thinking that they were surrounded, surrendered: 62 prisoners were taken and 250 yards of enemy trench captured. Earlier, Private Kerr's fingers had been blown off, but he did not have his wound dressed until he and two other men had escorted the prisoners back under fire and reported for duty.

His Victoria Cross is displayed at the Canadian War Museum in Ottawa, Ontario, Canada.

Mount Kerr in the Victoria Cross Ranges in Jasper National Park, Alberta, was named in his honour in 1951, and in 2006 Chip Kerr Park in Port Moody, British Columbia, was dedicated.

After the war he returned to farm in Alberta and also worked in the oil patch and as a forest ranger in Alberta.

He was a great uncle of Greg Kerr, member of Parliament for West Nova 2008–15.

See also 

Military history of Nova Scotia

References

Further reading 
Monuments to Courage (David Harvey, 1999)
The Register of the Victoria Cross (This England, 1997)
VCs of the First World War - The Somme (Gerald Gliddon, 1994)

External links
 John Chipman Kerr's digitized service file
 John Chipman Kerr biography on DND's Directorate of History and Heritage
 Legion Magazine article on John Kerr
 Kerr's Medals at the Canadian War Museum
 City of Port Moody - Chip Kerr memorial
 
 List of Canadian Victoria Cross recipients

Canadian Battle of the Somme recipients of the Victoria Cross
1887 births
1963 deaths
People from Cumberland County, Nova Scotia
Canadian Expeditionary Force soldiers
Canadian Army soldiers
Canadian military personnel of World War I
Burials at Mountain View Cemetery (Vancouver)
Canadian military personnel from Nova Scotia
Loyal Edmonton Regiment
Loyal Edmonton Regiment soldiers